Getting on in the World is a 1948 Czechoslovak drama film directed by Karel Steklý.

Cast
 Ladislav Boháč as Karel Kubát - director fy Globus
 Marie Vásová as Pavla Ulrychová
 Eduard Linkers as Antonín Klika - banker
 Stanislav Langer as Vilém Julis - general director
 Jiřina Petrovická as Luisa
 Marie Rosulková as Mrs. Julisová
 Jarmila Kurandová as Mrs. Ulrychová
 Dana Medřická as Hermína - manicurist
 František Vnouček as Polák - redactor
 Karel Pavlík as Director of audit department
 František Filipovský as Servant

References

External links
 

1948 films
1948 drama films
Czech drama films
Czechoslovak drama films
1940s Czech-language films
Czech black-and-white films
Czechoslovak black-and-white films
Films directed by Karel Steklý
1940s Czech films